James B. Preston (died December 20, 1902) was an American politician from Maryland. He served as a member of the Maryland House of Delegates, representing Harford County from 1880 to 1884.

Early life
James B. Preston was born near Rocks, in Harford County, Maryland. He was educated at Bel Air Academy.

Career
Preston was a Democrat. He served as a member of the Maryland House of Delegates, representing Harford County from 1880 to 1884.

Preston owned a mill on Deer Creek.

Personal life
Preston married Mary A. Wilks. They had two sons, Walter W., and James H. His son Walter was also a state delegate. His wife died in 1874. Preston married Cornelia E. Holmes, daughter of Judge John B. Holmes, on April 17, 1884. His wife died in 1887. He lived near Emmorton.

Preston died on December 20, 1902, at the age of 76, at the home of his son in Bel Air. He was buried at Rock Spring Cemetery in Bel Air.

References

Year of birth uncertain
1820s births
1902 deaths
People from Harford County, Maryland
Democratic Party members of the Maryland House of Delegates